The United Front for Revolutionary Action (abbreviated as FUAR) was a short-lived militant organization which was the paramilitary wing of the Communist Party of El Salvador from 1962 to 1964. The organization, which was led by Schafik Hándal, did not carry out any militant activities. A combination of targeting by the National Democratic Organization on orders of President Julio Adalberto Rivera Carballo and Communist Party General-Secretary Cayetano Carpio's decision to abolish the group led to the group's disestablishment in 1964.

See also 

Communist Party of El Salvador
Unified Popular Action Front
Christian Federation of Salvadoran Peasants

References 

1960s establishments in El Salvador
1960s disestablishments in El Salvador